Stephen Bloom may refer to:

Stephen G. Bloom (born 1951), American journalist and professor of journalism
Stephen R. Bloom (born 1942), British professor of medicine
Stephen Bloom (politician) (born 1961), member of the Pennsylvania House of Representatives